Darbidu (also Romanized as Darbīdū) is a village in Deh Chah Rural District, Poshtkuh District, Neyriz County, Fars Province, Iran. At the 2006 census, its population was 165, in 38 families.

References 

Populated places in Neyriz County